Artem Andriyovych Pospyelov (born 11 January 1998) is a Ukrainian professional football goalkeeper who plays for Polissya Zhytomyr in the Ukrainian First League.

Career

Early years
Pospyelov was born in Berdychiv, and at the age of 7 began to play football in his native town, where he joined the local youth sportive school. His first coach was Serhiy Kopytko. He continued his football formation at Darnytsia Kyiv and at Shakhtar Donetsk academy.

Mariupol
In July 2017, he moved to the Ukrainian Premier League side Mariupol and played for it in the Ukrainian Premier League Reserves and Under 19 Championship during two seasons. In August 2019 he was promoted to the main squad to play in the Ukrainian Premier League. Pospyelov made his debut in the Ukrainian Premier League as a starting squad player on 19 July 2020, playing in a winning away match against Lviv.

References

External links
 
 

1998 births
Living people
People from Berdychiv
Ukrainian footballers
Association football goalkeepers
FC Mariupol players
FC Kramatorsk players
FC Polissya Zhytomyr players
Ukrainian Premier League players
Ukrainian First League players
Sportspeople from Zhytomyr Oblast
21st-century Ukrainian people